Delias albertisi  is a species of butterfly in the family Pieridae. It was first described by Charles Oberthür in 1880 and is found in the Indomalayan realm.

The wingspan is about 50–60 mm. Adults are easily distinguished by the yellow subbasal band on the underside of the hindwings.

Subspecies
Delias albertisi albertisi (West Irian: Arfak Mountains)
Delias albertisi albiplaga Joicey & Talbot, 1922 (West Irian: Weyland Mountains)
Delias albertisi discoides Talbot, 1937 (Irian Jaya: Jayapura, Cyclop Mountains)

References

External links
Delias at Markku Savela's Lepidoptera and Some Other Life Forms

albertisi
Butterflies described in 1880